The Lamine River is a  tributary of the Missouri River in central Missouri in the United States. At Clifton City, the river has a mean annual discharge of 455 cubic feet per second. Below the mouth of the Blackwater River, its discharge averages 1,279 cubic feet per second (see Blackwater River.)

The river was named by French explorers for mining operations in the area. According to the Geographic Names Information System, the river has also been known as "La Mine River" and as "Rivière a la Mine."
The unincorporated community of Lamine and the township of Lamine were named after the La Mine River.

Location

Mouth Confluence with the Missouri River, Cooper County, Missouri: 
Source Confluence of Flat Creek and Richland Creek, Morgan County, Missouri:

See also
List of Missouri rivers

References

Columbia Gazetteer of North America entry

Rivers of Missouri
Tributaries of the Missouri River
Rivers of Cooper County, Missouri
Rivers of Morgan County, Missouri
Rivers of Pettis County, Missouri